Aristaea eurygramma is a moth of the family Gracillariidae. It is known from South Africa.

The larvae feed on Lantana camara. They probably mine the leaves of their host plant.

References

Endemic moths of South Africa
Aristaea
Moths of Africa
Moths described in 1961